Wallophis brachyura, known commonly as the Indian smooth snake or suvaro saap, is a species of rare harmless snake in the family Colubridae. The species is endemic to India.

Geographic range
W. brachyura is found in isolated localities in the state of Maharashtra in western peninsular India.

Habitat
The preferred habitat of W. brachyura is dry plains.

Description
The following description is based on Malcolm Smith (1943):

Nostril large, between two nasals; internasals 0.3 to 0.5 as long as the prefrontals; frontal nearly as broad as long, in contact with a large preocular; loreal longer than high; 2 postoculars; temporals 2+2; 8 supralabials, 4th and 5th touching the eye; anterior genials larger than the posterior, the latter separated by two or three series of small scales. Scales in 23:23:19 rows; ventrals large, rounded; tail rather short. Ventrals 200–224;  Caudals 46–53;  Anals 1.

Hemipenis extending to the 13th caudal plate, not forked. The distal half is calyculate, the cups being large and with scalloped edges; the proximal half is spinose, two or three spines at the base being much larger than the others  (bad specimen).

Olive-brown above, with indistinct light variegations on the anterior half of the body and head; lower parts whitish.
Total length: males , tail ; females , tail .

Range. Northern India. Poona district and Visapur, near Bombay; S.E. Berar.

A rare snake.

Diet
The diet of W. brachyura is unknown.

Reproduction
The manner of reproduction of W. brachyura is unknown.

References

Further reading
Boulenger GA (1890). The Fauna of British India, Including Ceylon and Burma. Reptilia and Batrachia. London: Secretary of State for India in Council. (Taylor and Francis, printers). xviii + 541 pp. (Coronella brachyura, p. 309).
Günther A (1866). "Fifth Account of new Species of Snakes in the Collection of the British Museum". Annals and Magazine of Natural History, Third Series 18: 24-29 + Plates VI-VII. (Zamenis brachyurus, new species, p. 27 + Plate VI, figure A).
Smith MA (1943). The Fauna of British India, Ceylon and Burma, Including the Whole of the Indo-Chinese Sub-region. Reptlia and Amphibia. Vol. III.—Serpentes. London: Secretary of State for India. (Taylor and Francis, printers). xii + 583 pp. (Coronella brachyura, pp. 194–195, Figure 60).

External links

https://web.archive.org/web/20030908232013/http://itgmv1.fzk.de/www/itg/uetz/herp/photos/Coronella_brachyura.jpg
http://www.indianaturewatch.net/displayimage.php?id=465144

Colubrids
Reptiles described in 1929
Taxa named by Franz Werner